Khan Jamal-e Panahi (also Romanized as Khān Jamāl-e Panāhī and Khānjamāl-e Panāhī) is a village in Bavaleh Rural District, in the Central District of Sonqor County, Kermanshah Province, Iran. At the 2006 census, its population was 330, in 70 families.

References 

Populated places in Sonqor County